Novo Naselje ("New Settlement") may refer to:

Novo Naselje (Novi Sad)
Novo Naselje (Subotica)
Novo Naselje (Futog)
Novo Naselje (Padinska Skela)
Novo Naselje (Lipljan)

See also
 Novo Selo (disambiguation)
 Novi Grad (disambiguation)